Mount Lavinia Grama Niladhari Division is a Grama Niladhari Division of the Ratmalana Divisional Secretariat of Colombo District of Western Province, Sri Lanka. It has Grama Niladhari Division Code 541.

Mount Lavinia is a surrounded by the Watarappala, Karagampitiya, Wathumulla, Jayathilaka, Wedikanda and Kawdana West Grama Niladhari Divisions.

Demographics

Ethnicity 

The Mount Lavinia Grama Niladhari Division has a Sinhalese majority (65.6%), a significant Moor population (16.1%) and a significant Sri Lankan Tamil population (14.7%). In comparison, the Ratmalana Divisional Secretariat (which contains the Mount Lavinia Grama Niladhari Division) has a Sinhalese majority (78.9%)

Religion 

The Mount Lavinia Grama Niladhari Division has a Buddhist majority (56.0%), a significant Muslim population (16.9%) and a significant Hindu population (10.8%). In comparison, the Ratmalana Divisional Secretariat (which contains the Mount Lavinia Grama Niladhari Division) has a Buddhist majority (70.0%) and a significant Muslim population (11.3%)

Colombo District
Grama Niladhari divisions of Sri Lanka

References